The 1984 United States Senate election in West Virginia was held on November 6, 1984. Incumbent Democratic U.S. Senator Jennings Randolph chose to retire instead of seeking re-election to a fifth term, and was succeeded by West Virginia Governor Jay Rockefeller, who defeated Republican John Raese in one of the closer races of the year.

Democratic primary

Candidates
 Ken Auvil, businessman from Belington
 Homer L. Harris, Republican nominee for U.S. Representative in 1982
 Jay Rockefeller, incumbent Governor of West Virginia
 Lacy W. Wright Jr., State Senator from Welch

Results

Republican primary

Candidates
 Frank Deem, former State Senator and Delegate from Vienna
 Samuel Kusic, State Senator from Weirton
 John Raese, businessman
 Henry C. Vigilianco
 Frederick A. Weiland

Results

General election

Results

See also 
  1984 United States Senate elections
  1984 West Virginia gubernatorial election

References

West Virginia
1984
1984 West Virginia elections